March 28, 2006 EP is a live album by American singer-songwriter Willy Mason, which was released in the USA in 2006. It was recorded at the Showbox in Seattle, Washington. All songs written by Willy Mason, except Lovesick Blues, by Cliff Friend and Irving Mills, and The Way I Am by Sonny Throckmorton.

Track listing
Where the Humans Eat
Gotta Keep Movin'
Hard Hand to Hold
Fear No Pain
Lovesick Blues
Oxygen
So Long
The Way I Am

Personnel
Willy mason – Vocals, guitar
Nina Violet – viola
Zak Borden – mandolin
Mike Grigoni – dobro
Matt Weiner – upright bass

Production
Recorded by John MacCormack
Mastered by Allan Tucker at Foothill Digital

References

2007 albums
Willy Mason albums